Bradley Kohler (born May 26, 1964) is an American former professional mixed martial artist who competed in the Heavyweight division. A professional from 1997 until 2012, Kohler competed for the UFC, RINGS and DEEP.

Career
Kohler made his professional debut in July 1997 at the HOOKnSHOOT: Absolute Fighting Championship 2 Heavyweight Tournament, winning a grueling quarterfinal fight against then 8–4 Travis Fulton via TKO at 52:24. In the semifinal he won via TKO due to a hand injury, and in the final faced Caz Daniels. He won after Daniels submitted from strikes at 17:35. After amassing a professional record of 7–0, he made his UFC debut against Tra Telligman at UFC Japan. Kohler was handed his first professional loss via armbar at 10:05.

Kohler's most notable fight occurred at UFC 22 against Steve Judson. Thirty seconds into the first round, Kohler feigned a takedown attempt, only to land a right cross. Judson was knocked out instantly, and suffered a deep gash to his chin at the point of impact. Remaining unconscious and showing signs of having difficulty breathing, referees immediately signaled to the medical staff who administered oxygen treatment to Judson, who was taken out via stretcher to the local hospital.

He made his return to MMA in 2010 after a near 6-year hiatus against Travis Fulton where he lost via KO in the first round 1:01 at CFX: Mayhem in Minneapolis.

Kohler fought for the last time in 2012 against Shane DeZee. Kohler won the fight by TKO after DeZee submitted to punches at 1:42 of round two.
Brad Kohler also competed in professional wrestling matches.

Mixed martial arts record

|-
| Win
| align=center| 12–15
| Shane DeZee
| TKO (submission to punches)
| Throwdown at the Crowne
| 
| align=center| 2
| align=center| 1:42
| St. Paul, Minnesota, United States
| 
|-
| Loss
| align=center| 11–15
| Brad Scholten
| TKO (doctor stoppage)
| Violent Night
| 
| align=center| 1
| align=center| 5:00
| Maplewood, Minnesota, United States
| 
|-
| Loss
| align=center| 11–14
| Cameron Befort
| TKO (submission to punches)
| Gladiator
| 
| align=center| 1
| align=center| 3:27
| Rochester, Minnesota, United States
| 
|-
| Loss
| align=center| 11–13
| Travis Fulton
| KO (head kick)
| XKL Evolution 2
| 
| align=center| 1
| align=center| 1:01
| Minneapolis, Minnesota, United States
| 
|-
| Loss
| align=center| 11–12
| Jong Wang Kim
| Submission (rear-naked choke)
| Gladiator FC: Day 1
| 
| align=center| 1
| align=center| 1:19
| South Korea
| 
|-
| Loss
| align=center| 11–11
| Dos Caras Jr.
| TKO (shoulder injury)
| DEEP: 12th Impact
| 
| align=center| 1
| align=center| 1:25
| Tokyo, Japan
| Openweight bout.
|-
| Loss
| align=center| 11–10
| Greg Wikan
| TKO (injury)
| UW: St. Cloud 1
| 
| align=center| 1
| align=center| 1:25
| Minnesota, United States
| 
|-
| Loss
| align=center| 11–9
| Valentijn Overeem
| Submission (kneebar)
| RINGS: Millennium Combine 2
| 
| align=center| 1
| align=center| 0:31
| Tokyo, Japan
| 
|-
| Loss
| align=center| 11–8
| Jason Allar
| TKO (strikes)
| EC 31: Extreme Challenge 31
| 
| align=center| 1
| align=center| 3:42
| Kenosha, Wisconsin, United States
| 
|-
| Loss
| align=center| 11–7
| Chris Haseman
| Submission (kimura)
| RINGS: King of Kings 1999 Final
| 
| align=center| 1
| align=center| 1:11
| Tokyo, Japan
| 
|-
| Loss
| align=center| 11–6
| Renato Sobral
| KO (soccer kick)
| WEF 8: Goin' Platinum
| 
| align=center| 2
| align=center| 0:50
| Rome, Georgia, United States
| 
|-
| Loss
| align=center| 11–5
| Mikhail Ilyukhin
| Submission (armbar)
| RINGS: King of Kings 1999 Block A
| 
| align=center| 1
| align=center| 2:16
| Tokyo, Japan
| 
|-
| Win
| align=center| 11–4
| Yoshihisa Yamamoto
| Submission (smother)
| RINGS: King of Kings 1999 Block A
| 
| align=center| 1
| align=center| 1:57
| Tokyo, Japan
| 
|-
| Win
| align=center| 10–4
| Steve Judson
| KO (punch)
| UFC 22
| 
| align=center| 1
| align=center| 0:30
| Lake Charles, Louisiana, United States
| 
|-
| Win
| align=center| 9–4
| Butch Williams
| Submission (armbar)
| UW: Ultimate Wrestling
| 
| align=center| 1
| align=center| 4:15
| Bloomington, Minnesota, United States
| 
|-
| Win
| align=center| 8–4
| Andy Douglas
| Submission (rear-naked choke)
| CC 3: Cage Combat 3
| 
| align=center| 1
| align=center| 1:30
| Cleveland, Ohio, United States
| 
|-
| Loss
| align=center| 7–4
| Dan Severn
| TKO
| UW: Ultimate Wrestling
| 
| align=center| 1
| align=center| 7:57
| Cleveland, Ohio, United States
| 
|-
| Loss
| align=center| 7–3
| Paul Pumphery
| TKO (injury)
| EC 17: Extreme Challenge 17
| 
| align=center| 1
| align=center| 0:06
| Cleveland, Ohio, United States
| 
|-
| Loss
| align=center| 7–2
| Joe Pardo
| Submission (heel hook)
| EC 17: Extreme Challenge 15
| 
| align=center| 1
| align=center| 1:43
| Muncie, Indiana, United States
| 
|-
| Loss
| align=center| 7–1
| Tra Telligman
| Submission (armbar)
| UFC Japan: Ultimate Japan
| 
| align=center| 1
| align=center| 10:05
| Yokohama, Japan
| 
|-
| Win
| align=center| 7–0
| Joe Slick
| TKO (corner stoppage)
| IFC 6: Battle at Four Bears
| 
| align=center| 1
| align=center| 4:12
| New Town, North Dakota, United States
| 
|-
| Win
| align=center| 6–0
| Joel Sutton
| TKO (corner stoppage)
| IFC 6: Battle at Four Bears
| 
| align=center| 1
| align=center| 1:24
| New Town, North Dakota, United States
| 
|-
| Win
| align=center| 5–0
| Sam Adkins
| TKO (cut)
| EC 9: Extreme Challenge 9
| 
| align=center| 1
| align=center| 6:56
| Davenport, Iowa, United States
| 
|-
| Win
| align=center| 4–0
| Scott Morton
| Submission (neck crank)
| EC 8: Extreme Challenge 8
| 
| align=center| 1
| align=center| 3:42
| Iowa, United States
| 
|-
| Win
| align=center| 3–0
| Caz Daniels
| TKO (submission to punches)
| HOOKnSHOOT: Absolute Fighting Championship 2
| 
| align=center| 1
| align=center| 17:35
| United States
| 
|-
| Win
| align=center| 2–0
| Frank Amalfitano
| TKO (hand injury)
| HOOKnSHOOT: Absolute Fighting Championship 2
| 
| align=center| 1
| align=center| 4:52
| United States
| 
|-
| Win
| align=center| 1–0
| Travis Fulton
| TKO (submission to punches)
| HOOKnSHOOT: Absolute Fighting Championship 2
| 
| align=center| 1
| align=center| 52:24
| United States
|

References

External links
 
 

1964 births
American male mixed martial artists
Mixed martial artists from Minnesota
Heavyweight mixed martial artists
Mixed martial artists utilizing Greco-Roman wrestling
Living people
People from Bloomington, Minnesota
Ultimate Fighting Championship male fighters